The VSB Poetry Prize is the most important Dutch language poetry prize.

It was awarded annually to a Dutch-language poet from 1994 until 2018. The prize winner was announced on the day before Poetry Day in the Netherlands, the last Thursday in January. It is funded by the VSB cultural fund, which was established by the Dutch bank Verenigde Spaarbank. The award was initiated through the efforts of Huub Oosterhuis.

The prize consisted of 25,000 Euros and a sculpture created by artist .

Prize winners

References 

Dutch poetry awards
Awards established in 1994
1994 establishments in the Netherlands